Lassie is a 2005 adventure comedy-drama film based on Eric Knight's 1940 novel Lassie Come-Home about the profound bond between Joe Carraclough and his rough collie, Lassie. The film was directed, written, and co-produced by Charles Sturridge and is a production of Samuel Goldwyn Films. The film stars Jonathan Mason and was distributed by Roadside Attractions and released in the UK on 16 December 2005. Filming took place in Scotland, Ireland and the Isle of Man. The supporting cast features Peter O'Toole, Samantha Morton, Peter Dinklage, Edward Fox, and John Lynch. The film was generally reviewed positively by critics, but performed poorly at the box office.

Plot
Sam Carraclough, an out-of-work miner who struggles to earn enough to feed his family, reluctantly sells their Collie dog, Lassie, to the Duke of Rudling, whose granddaughter, Cilla, sees and likes her. Sam's young son, Joe, is left heartbroken. The Duke's servant, Hynes, scares Lassie, who keeps escaping and coming back to the Carracloughs who have to keep returning her, and Hynes blames the boy for Lassie's departures.

For the holiday season, the duke goes to the Scottish Highlands, taking Lassie with him.  Lassie escapes once again, with Cilla's help, after Hynes beats the dog, for which the duke fires him, and makes the 500-mile journey back to Yorkshire. Meanwhile, Sam enlists in World War I to support his family. During her journey, Lassie climbs mountains, swims a river, passes Loch Ness, dodges municipal dog catchers and is taken in by a kindly puppeteer and circus performer (Peter Dinklage) and befriends his small dog, Toots. Later, they are attacked by men who kill the small dog and the angered performer and Lassie chase the men away. Lassie parts with her new friend and reaches home on Christmas Day but collapses outside the church in which the family is in. When mass is over, the family's other dog help them find Lassie, exhausted, ill and nearly dead, and take her home. The veterinarian tells the family that Lassie might not survive. When Hynes, living in the village, sees that Lassie has been found, he, accompanied by police officers, goes to the house to seize Lassie and take her to the Duke's local estate. The family is forced to accompany her. The duke, recognizing Lassie, instead lets the family keep her by denying that it is the same dog and evicts Hynes from his premises for good. After Lassie recovers, the duke offers Hynes' old job and tied house to Sam and his family. Cilla sees that her crusty grandfather has a soft side and visits the family to see Lassie's new puppies. Joe and Cilla play with Lassie and her puppies as the movie ends.

Cast

 Jonathan Mason as Joe Carraclough
 Peter O'Toole as The Duke of Rudling
 Samantha Morton as Sarah Carraclough
 John Lynch as Sam Carraclough
 Steve Pemberton as Hynes
 Hester Odgers as Cilla
 Jemma Redgrave as Daisy
 Peter Dinklage as Rowlie
 Edward Fox as Colonel Hulton
 Gregor Fisher as Mapes
 Kelly Macdonald as Jeanie
 Nicholas Lyndhurst as Buckle
 Dermot Ward as Court Usher
 Mason (uncredited) as Lassie
 DR Dakota (uncredited) as action Lassie

Production
This is the eleventh movie about Lassie, according to the producers. It is based on Eric Knight's 1940 novel Lassie Come-Home. Filming took place in Scotland, Ireland and on the Isle of Man.

Reception
The film earned $6,442,854 worldwide. The film-critics aggregator Rotten Tomatoes recorded 93% positive reviews from 70 critics, while the film scored of 84 out of 100 on Metacritic based on 15 reviews. A New York Times reviewer said the film "balances cruelty and tenderness, pathos and humor without ever losing sight of its youngest audience member" and also exclaimed, "This 'Lassie' exhibits a repertory of facial expressions that would put Jim Carrey to shame". Empire's Anna Smith wrote "Thanks to a relatively gritty setting and an estimable adult cast, this sentimental story is rendered bearable for adults and children alike." BBC's Neil Smith said, "The combination of everyone's favourite canine and eye-catching Irish and Isle of Man locations ensure this nostalgic shaggy-dog story sends you home with your tail wagging."

Awards

Broadcast Film Critics Association Awards 2007

Irish Film and Television Awards 2007

Audience Award

Women Film Critics Circle Awards 2006

Young Artist Awards 2007

Video game

A video game was released in 2005 on the PlayStation 2, and was negatively received.

References

External links 
Lassie: The Official Site

DR Dakota the action dog in Lassie 2005 film

2005 films
2000s historical films
British historical films
Lassie films
Films directed by Charles Sturridge
Roadside Attractions films
Samuel Goldwyn Films films
DreamWorks Classics
English-language French films
English-language Irish films
2000s English-language films
American adventure comedy-drama films
2000s American films
2000s British films